Gullit Asante Okyere (born 23 May 1988) is an Italian footballer descent who plays as a forward for Prevalle. He was named after Dutch footballer Ruud Gullit.

Early life
Okyere was born in Santa Maria Capua Vetere, Italy as son of Ghanaian immigrants who later moved to Palazzolo sull'Oglio.

Career
He began his career at Atalanta youth team  In mid-2007, he joined Caravaggese of Serie C2. He returned to Atalanta in the 2008–09 season, playing with the Primavera under-19 team.

In summer 2009 he left the team for Caravaggese.

In summer 2010 he joined Eccellenza amateurs Palazzolo on a free transfer.

After two years, he joined the squad of ScanzoPedrengo, in Eccellenza; he played all the 34 games of the season scoring also 25 goals; the team finished the championship in the second position.

Later, he played with Grumellese in Eccellenza, scoring 12 goals in 25 matches in the 2013–2014 season.

In July 2016 he joins Giana Erminio team in Italian Lega Pro signing a single year contract, which was later renewed also for the following season.

He left Giana Erminio in 2018 to join Serie D club Pergolettese.

On 21 July 2019, he moved to Serie D club Virtus CiseranoBergamo.

He signed for Eccellenza amateurs Lumezzane in July 2021.

After winning promotion with Lumezzane, in July 2022 Gullit left to sign for another Eccellenza club, Prevalle.

References

External links 
 
 USO Profile

Calciatori Profile

1988 births
Italian people of Ghanaian descent
Italian sportspeople of African descent
Living people
People from Santa Maria Capua Vetere
Italian footballers
Atalanta B.C. players
A.S. Giana Erminio players
U.S. Pergolettese 1932 players
Virtus Bergamo Alzano Seriate 1909 players
Association football forwards
Serie C players
Serie D players
Footballers from Campania
Sportspeople from the Province of Caserta